Amadou Koné (born 24 August 1966) is a Ivorian politician from Rally of the Republicans who serves as Minister of Transport in the Achi II government.

References

Living people
1966 births
21st-century Ivorian politicians
Transport Ministers of Ivory Coast
Université Laval alumni